The Woy Woy railway tunnel is a heritage-listed railway tunnel located between Wondabyne and Woy Woy stations on the Main Northern railway line in New South Wales, Australia. The dual-track  tunnel was opened on 16 January 1888. It was added to the New South Wales State Heritage Register on 28 June 2013.

Description

Woy Woy Tunnel is a  double track railway tunnel passing beneath a sandstone ridge between Brisbane Water and Mullet Creek. The tunnel is of brick construction throughout. The tunnel was originally built for double track service and thus did not require widening when the line was duplicated in 1906. The brick portals feature a brick string course, but are otherwise plain. The tunnel is horseshoe shaped, straight and has an average 1 in 150 gradient. There is a long cutting in bedrock leading to both portals.

At the time of its completion in 1888, the tunnel was the longest railway tunnel in Australia.

Construction history
Construction commenced on 1 March 1884. There was a breaking through ceremony on 17 July 1886; and the official opening was held on 16 January 1888. During construction the tunnel entrance had a crimson streamer stretched across it with the Latin phrase Labor omnia vincit, meaning, Hard work conquers all. A  hill rises above the tunnel. Perforation work for the tunnel was provided by ten percussion rock-drills using compressed air obtained from a  engine. Approximately  of rock were excavated and approximately 10,000,000 bricks were laid, supplied by Gore Hill Brickworks. No less than 10,000 cement casks were used.

Flooding of the area occurred in 1887, resulting in an inspection of the site by Henry Deane,

The Herald reported:

Homebush-Waratah line
The construction of the Homebush-Waratah line was broken up into sections:
 Hornsby-Hawkesbury,  opened 7 April 1887;
 Hawkesbury River Railway Bridge-Mullet Creek, opened 1 May 1889;
 Mullet Creek-Gosford, opened 16 January 1888;
 Gosford-Waratah, opened 15 August 1887.

Between April 1887 and May 1889, the Woy Woy Tunnel's major benefit of significantly reduced travel times were not able to be fully appreciated by passengers until the completion of the Hawkesbury-Mullet Creek section of track which involved the construction of the first Hawkesbury River railway bridge. Prior to the opening of the Hawkesbury-Mullet Creek section, which was dictated by the opening of the Hawkesbury River bridge, passengers disembarked from either Hawkesbury River, from the south, and Mullet Creek (closed 11 September 1897), from the north. Passengers were required to catch a ferry between Hawkesbury River and Mullet Creek that met with trains at both terminus.

Gauge and loading gauge
The line was built with  tracks and a loading gauge that accommodated  carriages on double track with  centres. In 1910, a new nation standard loading gauge was adopted for all mainland states, which was applied to all new works. In the 1920s, in the Sydney electrified area, the wider standard allowed for 3+2 seating in lieu of 2+2 seating.

Problems started to arise when in 1960 when the line though Woy Woy was electrified using so-called narrow stock. More problems arose in the 1972 with the introduction of double deck carriages, which required the removal of brickwork in the top corners of the circular tunnel profile with the roadbed lowered.

Original planned tunnel location
The following extract is from the New South Wales Legislative Assembly, 1 December 1881, Answers to Questions, as reported by The Sydney Morning Herald, in relation to connecting the Great Southern and Northern Lines via the construction of the Homebush-Waratah Line:...From this point the line takes a north-easterly direction towards Flat Rock Point, crosses the channel between the southern mainland and Long Island; thence across the Hawkesbury River to Dangar Island ( from Redfern); and thence across the main channel of the river to a tunnel through the cliffs on the northern bank to Patonga Creek; thence by a tunnel through the high land between that creek and Woy Woy Creek, thence across that creek and skirting the western shore of Brisbane Water, across Narrara Creek through to the village of Gosford...''

This original route and Tunnel location was not adopted.

Heritage listing 
The Woy Woy Railway Tunnel has historic significance, as at the time of its construction it was the longest tunnel in Australia and was recognised as one of two major engineering feats on the Short North line, the other being the Hawkesbury River Rail Bridge. The tunnel has associations with the linking of Sydney and Newcastle by rail and remains an essential component of this stretch of line.

The tunnel has aesthetic significance as it provides a powerful aesthetic break in the rail journey between Sydney and the Central Coast separating the rugged beauty along Mullet Creek from the flat urban sprawl of Woy Woy and Gosford. Along with other tunnels on the Short North line it adds to the aesthetic significance of the line as a whole with its man made engineering elements contrasting with the natural surrounds of the Hawkesbury River region, demonstrating the skills and technology available at the time of construction and a high degree of engineering achievement in building a railway line in difficult terrain.

Woy Woy Tunnel was listed on the New South Wales State Heritage Register on 28 June 2013 having satisfied the following criteria.

The place is important in demonstrating the course, or pattern, of cultural or natural history in New South Wales.

Woy Woy Railway Tunnel has historic significance as at the time of its construction it was the longest tunnel in Australia and was recognised as one of two major engineering feats on the Short North Line, the other being the Hawkesbury River Rail Bridge. The tunnel has associations with the linking of Sydney and Newcastle by rail and remains an essential component of this stretch of line.

The place is important in demonstrating aesthetic characteristics and/or a high degree of creative or technical achievement in New South Wales.

Along with other tunnels on the Short North line it adds to the aesthetic significance of the line as a whole with its man made engineering elements contrasting with the natural surrounds of the Hawkesbury River region. The tunnels add to the experience of travelling on the Sydney to Newcastle line.

The tunnel has technical significance. It demonstrates the skills and technology available at the time of construction and it forms part of a set of tunnels and bridges on the Short North line that demonstrate a high degree of engineering achievement in building a railway line in difficult terrain. At the time of its construction it was the longest railway tunnel in Australia. It is currently the longest railway tunnel in NSW (excluding the Sydney City Circle underground network).

The place has potential to yield information that will contribute to an understanding of the cultural or natural history of New South Wales.

The tunnel itself has minimal archaeological research potential. However, the navvy camp near the Mullet Creek portal has considerable potential to inform our understanding of the working lives of railway construction workers. Archaeological remains of railway workers camps on the scale likely to remain at the Woy Woy tunnel are rare in NSW.

The place possesses uncommon, rare or endangered aspects of the cultural or natural history of New South Wales.

The tunnel is not rare. There are numerous other examples of this construction in the State and on the Short North line, including Tickhole Tunnel and the tunnels in the vicinity of the Hawkesbury River Rail Bridge. It is however, the longest tunnel outside the Sydney underground network, which makes it distinctive.

The place is important in demonstrating the principal characteristics of a class of cultural or natural places/environments in New South Wales.

The tunnel is a good example of its type and is representative of double track railway tunnels within the NSW rail network. It is the oldest tunnel still in use in NSW and the longest tunnel outside the Sydney underground rail network.

Tragedies

See also

 List of tunnels in Australia

Notes
1. Circa 1886, both Australian and imported cement was packaged in wooden casks, each containing 3 bushels, about 4 to 4.25 cubic feet (about 170 kg net) depending upon the fineness of the cement. The density of cement specified in 1886 for City of Sydney use was 112 to 113 pounds per bushel.

References

Attribution

External links

Transport on the Central Coast (New South Wales)
Railway tunnels in New South Wales
Tunnels completed in 1887
Works of John Whitton
New South Wales State Heritage Register
Central Coast Council (New South Wales)
Main North railway line, New South Wales